Burmese numerals are a set of numerals traditionally used in the Burmese language, although Arabic numerals are also used. Burmese numerals follow the Hindu–Arabic numeral system commonly used in the rest of the world.

Main numbers

Zero to nine

1 Burmese for zero comes from Sanskrit śūnya.

Spoken Burmese has innate pronunciation rules that govern numbers when they are combined with another word, be it a numerical place (e.g. tens, hundreds, thousands, etc.) or a measure word.

 For one, two, and seven (all of which end in the rhyme ), when combined, shift to an open vowel, namely the schwa
 For three, four, five, and nine which all have the long tone (similar to the flat tone in pinyin), when combined, the word immediately following it, given that it begins with a consonant, shifts to a voiced consonant (e.g., "40" is pronounced , not ).
 For six and eight, no pronunciation shift occurs.

These pronunciation shifts are exclusively confined to spoken Burmese and are not spelt any differently.

Ten to a million

1 Shifts to voiced consonant following three, four, five, and nine.

2 Athinche sometimes could mean "too large to be counted".

Ten to nineteen are almost always expressed without including  (one).

Another pronunciation rule shifts numerical place name (the tens, hundreds and thousands place) from the low tone to the creaky tone.
Number places from 10 up to 107 has increment of 101. Beyond those Number places, larger number places have increment of 107. 1014 up to 10140 has increment of 107. 
There are totally 27 major number places in Burmese numerals from 1×100 to 10140
In typical speech, the shift goes farther to ( or ).
Hence, a number like 301 is pronounced , while 300 is pronounced .

The digits of a number are expressed in order of decreasing digits place. For example, 1,234,567 is expressed as follows (where the highlighted portions represent numbers whose tone has shifted from low → creaky:

1 When combined with the numeral place, the pronunciations for 1 and 2 shift from a checked tone (glottal stop) to an open vowel.

Round number rule
When a number is used as an adjective, the standard word order is: number + measure word (e.g.  for "5 cups"). However, for round numbers (numbers ending in zeroes), the word order is flipped to: measure word + number (e.g. , not , for "20 bottles"). The exception to this rule is the number 10, which follows the standard word order.

Ordinal numbers
Ordinal numbers, from first to tenth, are Burmese pronunciations of their Pali equivalents. They are prefixed to the noun. Beyond that, cardinal numbers can be raised to the ordinal by suffixing the particle  (lit. "to raise") to the number in the following order: number + measure word + .

Decimal and fractional numbers
Colloquially, decimal numbers are formed by saying  (Pali for 'tenth') where the decimal separator is located.

Other fractional numbers are verbally expressed as follows: denominator +  + numerator + .  literally translates as "portion."

Alternate numbers
Other numbers, not of Tibeto-Burman origin, are also found in the Burmese language, usually from Pali or Sanskrit. They are exceedingly rare in modern usage.

See also 
 Burmese language
 Burmese numerical classifiers
 Indian numbering system
 Indian numerals

References

External links

Numerals
Numerals
Numerals